Amastrini is a tribe of treehoppers in the family Membracidae.

Genera
 Amastris Stål, 1860 c g b
 Aurimastris
 Bajulata Ball, 1933 c g b
 Erosne
 Harmonides
 Hygris
 Idioderma Van Duzee, 1909 c g b
 Lallemandia
 Neotynelia
 Tynelia
 Vanduzea Goding, 1893 c g b
Data sources: i = ITIS, c = Catalogue of Life, g = GBIF, b = Bugguide.net

References

Further reading

External links

 

Hemiptera tribes
Smiliinae